This page lists all described species of the spider family Uloboridae accepted by the World Spider Catalog :

A

Ariston

Ariston O. Pickard-Cambridge, 1896
 A. aglasices Salvatierra, Tourinho & Brescovit, 2014 — Mexico
 A. albicans O. Pickard-Cambridge, 1896 (type) — Mexico to Panama
 A. aristus Opell, 1979 — Panama
 A. mazolus Opell, 1979 — Mexico
 A. spartanus Salvatierra, Tourinho & Brescovit, 2014 — Brazil

Astavakra

Astavakra Lehtinen, 1967
 A. sexmucronata (Simon, 1893) (type) — Philippines

B

† Bicalamistrum

† Bicalamistrum Wunderlich, 2015

† Burmasuccinus

† Burmasuccinus Wunderlich, 2018

† Burmuloborus

† Burmuloborus Wunderlich, 2008

C

Conifaber

Conifaber Opell, 1982
 C. guarani Grismado, 2004 — Paraguay, Argentina
 C. manicoba Salvatierra, Brescovit & Tourinho, 2017 — Brazil
 C. parvus Opell, 1982 (type) — Colombia
 C. yasi Grismado, 2004 — Argentina

D

Daramulunia

Daramulunia Lehtinen, 1967
 D. gibbosa (L. Koch, 1872) (type) — Samoa
 D. tenella (L. Koch, 1872) — Vanuatu, Fiji, Samoa

E

† Eomiagrammopes

† Eomiagrammopes Wunderlich, 2004

F

† Furculoborus

† Furculoborus Wunderlich, 2017

H

† Hyptiomopes

† Hyptiomopes Wunderlich, 2004

Hyptiotes

Hyptiotes Walckenaer, 1837
 H. affinis Bösenberg & Strand, 1906 — India, China, Korea, Taiwan, Japan
 H. akermani Wiehle, 1964 — South Africa
 H. analis Simon, 1892 — Sri Lanka
 H. cavatus (Hentz, 1847) — USA, Canada
 H. dentatus Wunderlich, 2008 — France
 H. fabaceus Dong, Zhu & Yoshida, 2005 — China
 H. flavidus (Blackwall, 1862) — Madeira, Mediterranean, Russia (Europe), Caucasus
 H. gerhardti Wiehle, 1929 — Greece, southern Russia
 H. gertschi Chamberlin & Ivie, 1935 — USA, Canada
 H. himalayensis Tikader, 1981 — India
 H. indicus Simon, 1905 — India
 H. paradoxus (C. L. Koch, 1834) (type) — Europe, Turkey, Caucasus
 H. puebla Muma & Gertsch, 1964 — USA, Mexico
 H. solanus Dong, Zhu & Yoshida, 2005 — China
 H. tehama Muma & Gertsch, 1964 — USA
 H. xinlongensis Liu, Wang & Peng, 1991 — China

J

† Jerseyuloborus

† Jerseyuloborus Wunderlich, 2011

K

† Kachin

† Kachin Wunderlich, 2017

L

Lubinella

Lubinella Opell, 1984
 L. morobensis Opell, 1984 (type) — New Guinea

M

Miagrammopes

Miagrammopes O. Pickard-Cambridge, 1870
 M. albocinctus Simon, 1893 — Venezuela
 M. alboguttatus F. O. Pickard-Cambridge, 1902 — Guatemala to Panama
 M. albomaculatus Thorell, 1891 — India (Nicobar Is.)
 M. animotus Chickering, 1968 — Puerto Rico
 M. apostrophus Sen, Saha & Raychaudhuri, 2013 — India
 M. aspinatus Chickering, 1968 — Panama
 M. auriventer Schenkel, 1953 — Venezuela
 M. bambusicola Simon, 1893 — Venezuela
 M. bifurcatus Dong, Yan, Zhu & Song, 2004 — China
 M. birabeni Mello-Leitão, 1945 — Argentina
 M. biroi Kulczyński, 1908 — New Guinea
 M. bradleyi O. Pickard-Cambridge, 1874 — Australia (New South Wales)
 M. brasiliensis Roewer, 1951 — Brazil
 M. brevicaudus O. Pickard-Cambridge, 1882 — South Africa
 M. brevior Kulczyński, 1908 — New Guinea
 M. brooksptensis Barrion & Litsinger, 1995 — Philippines
 M. cambridgei Thorell, 1887 — Myanmar, Indonesia (Sumatra)
 M. caudatus Keyserling, 1890 — Australia (Queensland)
 M. ciliatus Petrunkevitch, 1926 — Puerto Rico, St. Vincent
 M. constrictus Purcell, 1904 — South Africa
 M. corticeus Simon, 1893 — Venezuela
 M. cubanus Banks, 1909 — Cuba
 M. extensus Simon, 1889 — India
 M. fasciatus Rainbow, 1916 — Australia (Queensland)
 M. ferdinandi O. Pickard-Cambridge, 1870 — Sri Lanka
 M. flavus (Wunderlich, 1976) — Australia (Queensland)
 M. gravelyi Tikader, 1971 — India
 M. grodnitskyi Logunov, 2018 — Vietnam
 M. gulliveri Butler, 1876 — Mauritius (Rodriguez)
 M. guttatus Mello-Leitão, 1937 — Brazil, Argentina
 M. indicus Tikader, 1971 — India
 M. intempus Chickering, 1968 — Panama
 M. kinabalu Logunov, 2018 — Malaysia (Borneo)
 M. kirkeensis Tikader, 1971 — India
 M. larundus Chickering, 1968 — Panama
 M. latens Bryant, 1936 — Cuba, Hispaniola
 M. lehtineni (Wunderlich, 1976) — Australia (Queensland)
 M. licinus Chickering, 1968 — Panama
 M. longicaudus O. Pickard-Cambridge, 1882 — South Africa
 M. luederwaldti Mello-Leitão, 1925 — Brazil
 M. maigsieus Barrion & Litsinger, 1995 — Philippines
 M. mexicanus O. Pickard-Cambridge, 1893 — USA, Mexico
 M. molitus Chickering, 1968 — Jamaica
 M. oblongus Yoshida, 1982 — Taiwan, Japan
 M. oblucus Chickering, 1968 — Jamaica
 M. orientalis Bösenberg & Strand, 1906 — China, Korea, Taiwan, Japan
 M. paraorientalis Dong, Zhu & Yoshida, 2005 — China
 M. pinopus Chickering, 1968 — Virgin Is.
 M. plumipes Kulczyński, 1911 — New Guinea
 M. poonaensis Tikader, 1971 — India
 M. raffrayi Simon, 1881 — Tanzania (Zanzibar), South Africa
 M. rimosus Simon, 1886 — Thailand, Vietnam
 M. romitii Caporiacco, 1947 — Guyana
 M. rubripes Mello-Leitão, 1949 — Brazil
 M. satpudaensis Rajoria, 2015 — India
 M. scoparius Simon, 1892 — St. Vincent
 M. sexpunctatus Simon, 1906 — India
 M. similis Kulczyński, 1908 — New Guinea
 M. simus Chamberlin & Ivie, 1936 — Panama
 M. singaporensis Kulczyński, 1908 — Singapore
 M. spatulatus Dong, Yan, Zhu & Song, 2004 — China
 M. sutherlandi Tikader, 1971 — India
 M. thwaitesi O. Pickard-Cambridge, 1870 (type) — India, Sri Lanka
 M. tonatus Chickering, 1968 — Jamaica
 M. trailli O. Pickard-Cambridge, 1882 — Brazil
 M. uludusun Logunov, 2018 — Malaysia (Borneo)
 M. unguliformis Dong, Yan, Zhu & Song, 2004 — China
 M. unipus Chickering, 1968 — Panama
 M. viridiventris Strand, 1911 — Indonesia (Kei Is.)

† Microuloborus

† Microuloborus Wunderlich, 2015

O

Octonoba

Octonoba Opell, 1979
 O. albicola Yoshida, 2012 — Taiwan
 O. ampliata Dong, Zhu & Yoshida, 2005 — China
 O. aurita Dong, Zhu & Yoshida, 2005 — China
 O. basuensis Hu, 2001 — China
 O. bicornuta Seo, 2018 — Korea
 O. biforata Zhu, Sha & Chen, 1989 — China
 O. dentata Dong, Zhu & Yoshida, 2005 — China
 O. digitata Dong, Zhu & Yoshida, 2005 — China
 O. grandiconcava Yoshida, 1981 — Japan (Ryukyu Is.)
 O. grandiprojecta Yoshida, 1981 — Japan (Ryukyu Is.)
 O. kentingensis Yoshida, 2012 — Taiwan
 O. lanyuensis Yoshida, 2012 — Taiwan
 O. longshanensis Xie, Peng, Zhang, Gong & Kim, 1997 — China
 O. okinawensis Yoshida, 1981 — Japan (Okinawa)
 O. paralongshanensis Dong, Zhu & Yoshida, 2005 — China
 O. paravarians Dong, Zhu & Yoshida, 2005 — China
 O. rimosa Yoshida, 1983 — Japan (Ryukyu Is.)
 O. sanyanensis Barrion, Barrion-Dupo & Heong, 2013 — China (Hainan)
 O. senkakuensis Yoshida, 1983 — Japan
 O. serratula Dong, Zhu & Yoshida, 2005 — China
 O. sinensis (Simon, 1880) (type) — China, Korea, Japan. Introduced to USA
 O. spinosa Yoshida, 1982 — Taiwan
 O. sybotides (Bösenberg & Strand, 1906) — China, Korea, Japan
 O. taiwanica Yoshida, 1982 — Taiwan
 O. tanakai Yoshida, 1981 — Japan (Ryukyu Is.)
 O. uncinata Yoshida, 1981 — Japan (Ryukyu Is.)
 O. varians (Bösenberg & Strand, 1906) — China, Korea, Japan
 O. wanlessi Zhang, Zhu & Song, 2004 — China
 O. xihua Barrion, Barrion-Dupo & Heong, 2013 — China (Hainan)
 O. yaeyamensis Yoshida, 1981 — Japan (Ryukyu Is.)
 O. yaginumai Yoshida, 1981 — Japan (Okinawa)
 O. yesoensis (Saito, 1934) — Caucasus, Russia (Far East), Iran to Japan
 O. yoshidai Tanikawa, 2006 — Japan

† Ocululoborus

† Ocululoborus Wunderlich, 2012

† Opellianus

† Opellianus Wunderlich, 2004

Orinomana

Orinomana Strand, 1934
 O. ascha Grismado, 2000 — Argentina
 O. bituberculata (Keyserling, 1881) (type) — Ecuador, Peru
 O. florezi Grismado & Rubio, 2015 — Colombia
 O. galianoae Grismado, 2000 — Argentina
 O. mana Opell, 1979 — Chile
 O. penelope Grismado & Rubio, 2015 — Ecuador
 O. viracocha Grismado & Rubio, 2015 — Peru

P

† Palaeomiagrammopes

† Palaeomiagrammopes Wunderlich, 2008

† Palaeouloborus

† Palaeouloborus Selden, 1990

† Paramiagrammopes

† Paramiagrammopes Wunderlich, 2008

Philoponella

Philoponella Mello-Leitão, 1917
 P. alata Lin & Li, 2008 — China
 P. angolensis (Lessert, 1933) — Ivory Coast, Angola
 P. arizonica (Gertsch, 1936) — USA, Mexico
 P. bella Opell, 1979 — Colombia
 P. collina (Keyserling, 1883) — Peru
 P. congregabilis (Rainbow, 1916) — Australia. Introduced to New Zealand
 P. cymbiformis Xie, Peng, Zhang, Gong & Kim, 1997 — China
 P. divisa Opell, 1979 — Colombia, Brazil
 P. duopunctata Faleiro & Santos, 2014 — Brazil
 P. fasciata (Mello-Leitão, 1917) — Brazil, Paraguay, Argentina
 P. fluviidulcifis Faleiro & Santos, 2014 — Brazil
 P. gibberosa (Kulczyński, 1908) — Indonesia (Java)
 P. herediae Opell, 1987 — Costa Rica
 P. hilaris (Simon, 1906) — India
 P. lingulata Dong, Zhu & Yoshida, 2005 — China
 P. lunaris (C. L. Koch, 1839) — Brazil
 P. mollis (Thorell, 1895) — Myanmar
 P. nasuta (Thorell, 1895) — China, Myanmar
 P. nigromaculata Yoshida, 1992 — Taiwan
 P. opelli Faleiro & Santos, 2014 — Ecuador, Brazil
 P. operosa (Simon, 1896) — South Africa
 P. oweni (Chamberlin, 1924) — USA, Mexico
 P. pantherina (Keyserling, 1890) — Australia (New South Wales)
 P. para Opell, 1979 — Paraguay, Argentina
 P. pisiformis Dong, Zhu & Yoshida, 2005 — China
 P. pomelita Grismado, 2004 — Argentina
 P. prominens (Bösenberg & Strand, 1906) — China, Korea, Taiwan, Japan
 P. quadrituberculata (Thorell, 1892) — Indonesia (Java, Moluccas)
 P. raffrayi (Simon, 1891) — Indonesia (Java, Moluccas)
 P. ramirezi Grismado, 2004 — Brazil
 P. republicana (Simon, 1891) (type) — Panama to Bolivia
 P. sabah Yoshida, 1992 — Borneo
 P. semiplumosa (Simon, 1893) — USA, Greater Antilles to Venezuela
 P. signatella (Roewer, 1951) — Mexico to Honduras
 P. subvittata Opell, 1981 — Guyana
 P. tingens (Chamberlin & Ivie, 1936) — Mexico to Colombia
 P. truncata (Thorell, 1895) — Myanmar, Indonesia (Java)
 P. variabilis (Keyserling, 1887) — Australia (Queensland, New South Wales)
 P. vicina (O. Pickard-Cambridge, 1899) — Mexico to Costa Rica
 P. vittata (Keyserling, 1881) — Panama to Paraguay
 P. wuyiensis Xie, Peng, Zhang, Gong & Kim, 1997 — China

† Planibulbus

† Planibulbus Wunderlich, 2018

Polenecia

Polenecia Lehtinen, 1967
 P. producta (Simon, 1873) (type) — Mediterranean to Azerbaijan

† Propterkachin

† Propterkachin Wunderlich, 2017

Purumitra

Purumitra Lehtinen, 1967
 P. australiensis Opell, 1995 — Australia (Queensland)
 P. grammica (Simon, 1893) (type) — Philippines, Caroline Is.

S

Siratoba

Siratoba Opell, 1979
 S. referens (Muma & Gertsch, 1964) (type) — USA, Mexico
 S. reticens (Gertsch & Davis, 1942) — Mexico

Sybota

Sybota Simon, 1892
 S. abdominalis (Nicolet, 1849) (type) — Chile
 S. atlantica Grismado, 2001 — Argentina
 S. compagnuccii Grismado, 2007 — Argentina
 S. mendozae Opell, 1979 — Argentina
 S. osornis Opell, 1979 — Chile
 S. rana (Mello-Leitão, 1941) — Argentina

T

† Talbragaraneus

† Talbragaraneus Selden and Beattie, 2013

Tangaroa

Tangaroa Lehtinen, 1967
 T. beattyi Opell, 1983 — Caroline Is.
 T. dissimilis (Berland, 1924) — Vanuatu, New Caledonia
 T. pukapukan Salvatierra, Brescovit & Tourinho, 2015 — Cook Is.
 T. tahitiensis (Berland, 1934) (type) — French Polynesia (Marquesas Is., Society Is., Austral Is.)
 T. vaka Salvatierra, Brescovit & Tourinho, 2015 — Cook Is.

U

Uaitemuri

Uaitemuri Santos & Gonzaga, 2017
 U. demariai Santos & Gonzaga, 2017 — Brazil
 U. rupicola Santos & Gonzaga, 2017 (type) — Brazil

† Ulobomopes

† Ulobomopes Wunderlich, 2004

Uloborus

Uloborus Latreille, 1806
 U. albescens O. Pickard-Cambridge, 1885 — China (Yarkand)
 U. albofasciatus Chrysanthus, 1967 — New Guinea
 U. albolineatus Mello-Leitão, 1941 — Argentina
 U. ater Mello-Leitão, 1917 — Brazil
 U. aureus Vinson, 1863 — Madagascar
 U. barbipes L. Koch, 1872 — Australia (Queensland)
 U. berlandi Roewer, 1951 — Guinea
 U. biconicus Yin & Hu, 2012 — China
 U. bigibbosus Simon, 1905 — India
 U. bispiralis Opell, 1982 — New Guinea
 U. campestratus Simon, 1893 — USA to Venezuela
 U. canescens C. L. Koch, 1844 — Colombia
 U. canus MacLeay, 1827 — Australia
 U. cellarius Yin & Yan, 2012 — China
 U. chinmoyiae Biswas & Raychaudhuri, 2013 — Bangladesh
 U. conus Opell, 1982 — New Guinea
 U. crucifaciens Hingston, 1927 — Myanmar
 U. cubicus (Thorell, 1898) — Myanmar
 U. danolius Tikader, 1969 — India (mainland, Nicobar Is.)
 U. diversus Marx, 1898 — USA, Mexico
 U. eberhardi Opell, 1981 — Costa Rica
 U. elongatus Opell, 1982 — Argentina
 U. emarginatus Kulczyński, 1908 — Indonesia (Java)
 U. ferokus Bradoo, 1979 — India
 U. filidentatus Hingston, 1932 — Guyana
 U. filifaciens Hingston, 1927 — India (Andaman Is.)
 U. filinodatus Hingston, 1932 — Guyana
 U. formosanus Yoshida, 2012 — Taiwan
 U. formosus Marx, 1898 — Mexico
 U. furunculus Simon, 1906 — India
 U. gilvus (Blackwall, 1870) — Italy, Greece
 U. glomosus (Walckenaer, 1841) — USA, Canada, Mexico
 U. guangxiensis Zhu, Sha & Chen, 1989 — China
 U. humeralis Hasselt, 1882 — Myanmar, Indonesia (Sumatra, Java)
 U. h. marginatus Kulczyński, 1908 — Indonesia (Java)
 U. inaequalis Kulczyński, 1908 — New Guinea
 U. jabalpurensis Bhandari & Gajbe, 2001 — India
 U. jarrei Berland & Millot, 1940 — Guinea
 U. kerevatensis Opell, 1991 — New Guinea
 U. khasiensis Tikader, 1969 — India
 U. krishnae Tikader, 1970 — India (mainland, Nicobar Is.)
 U. leucosagma Thorell, 1895 — Myanmar
 U. limbatus Thorell, 1895 — Myanmar
 U. llastay Grismado, 2002 — Argentina
 U. lugubris (Thorell, 1895) — Myanmar
 U. metae Opell, 1981 — Colombia
 U. minutus Mello-Leitão, 1915 — Brazil
 U. modestus Thorell, 1891 — India (Nicobar Is.)
 U. montifer Marples, 1955 — Samoa
 U. niger Mello-Leitão, 1917 — Brazil
 U. oculatus Kulczyński, 1908 — Singapore
 U. parvulus Schmidt, 1976 — Canary Is.
 U. penicillatoides Xie, Peng, Zhang, Gong & Kim, 1997 — China
 U. pictus Thorell, 1898 — Myanmar
 U. pinnipes Thorell, 1877 — Indonesia (Sulawesi)
 U. planipedius Simon, 1896 — East, South Africa
 U. plumipes Lucas, 1846 — Europe, Africa, Yemen, Iran, Pakistan. Introduced to Argentina, Philippines, Japan
 U. p. javanus Kulczyński, 1908 — Indonesia (Java)
 U. plumosus Schmidt, 1956 — Guinea
 U. pteropus (Thorell, 1887) — Myanmar
 U. rufus Schmidt & Krause, 1995 — Cape Verde Is.
 U. scutifaciens Hingston, 1927 — Myanmar
 U. segregatus Gertsch, 1936 — USA to Colombia
 U. sexfasciatus Simon, 1893 — Philippines
 U. spelaeus Bristowe, 1952 — Malaysia
 U. strandi (Caporiacco, 1940) — Ethiopia
 U. tenuissimus L. Koch, 1872 — Samoa
 U. tetramaculatus Mello-Leitão, 1940 — Brazil
 U. trifasciatus Thorell, 1890 — Indonesia (Sunda Is.)
 U. trilineatus Keyserling, 1883 — Mexico to Argentina
 U. umboniger Kulczyński, 1908 — Sri Lanka
 U. undulatus Thorell, 1878 — Indonesia (Java) to New Guinea
 U. u. indicus Kulczyński, 1908 — Malaysia
 U. u. obscurior Kulczyński, 1908 — New Guinea
 U. u. pallidior Kulczyński, 1908 — Indonesia (Java) to New Guinea
 U. vanillarum Vinson, 1863 — Madagascar
 U. velutinus Butler, 1883 — Madagascar
 U. villosus Keyserling, 1881 — Colombia
 U. viridimicans Simon, 1893 — Philippines
 U. walckenaerius Latreille, 1806 (type) — Madeira, Europe, Turkey, Caucasus, Russia (Europe to Far East), Iraq, Iran, Central Asia, China, Korea, Japan

W

Waitkera

Waitkera Opell, 1979
 W. waitakerensis (Chamberlain, 1946) (type) — New Zealand

Z

Zosis

Zosis Walckenaer, 1841
 Z. costalimae (Mello-Leitão, 1917) — Brazil
 Z. geniculata (Olivier, 1789) (type) — Southern USA to Brazil, Caribbean. Introduced to Macaronesia, West Africa, Seychelles, India, Indonesia, Philippines, China, Korea, Japan, Australia, Hawaii
 Z. g. altissima (Franganillo, 1926) — Cuba
 Z. g. fusca (Caporiacco, 1948) — Guyana
 Z. g. humilis (Franganillo, 1926) — Cuba
 Z. g. quadripunctata (Franganillo, 1926) — Cuba
 Z. g. similis (Franganillo, 1926) — Cuba
 Z. g. timorensis (Schenkel, 1944) — Timor
 Z. peruana (Keyserling, 1881) — Colombia to Argentina

References

Uloboridae